Riverside Elementary School may refer to
Riverside Elementary School (Pearl River, Louisiana)
Riverside Elementary School (Reading, Pennsylvania)
Riverside Elementary School (Wichita, Kansas)